China Reinsurance (Group) Corporation ("China RE") is one of the largest reinsurance groups in China.

History and Company Background
China Re originated from The People's Insurance Company of China, the first insurance company in the People's Republic of China founded in 1949. China Re was co-founded by the Ministry of Finance of the People's Republic of China and the Central Huijin Investment Company Limited with a registered capital of RMB36,407,611,085 on 22 August 1996.

References 

Financial services companies established in 1949
Reinsurance companies
Insurance companies of China
Companies listed on the Hong Kong Stock Exchange